Zhenskii vestnik (Women's Herald) was a Russian monthly magazine published in Saint Petersburg in 1866–1868 by A.B. Messarosh, with the professed objective of "helping to improve the social conditions for women in Russia". In 1866—1867 Zhenskii vestnik remained one of the just two journals in the country (alongside Delo), belonging to the left and trying to continue the traditions set by Sovremennik, closed in 1866.

Its formal editor-in-chief of it was N.M. Messarosh, but in reality the journal was run by the two prominent authors and journalists who came from the recently shut down Russkoe slovo, Nikolai Blagoveshchensky and Alexander Sheller. Apart from them, among the authors who contributed to it regularly were Vasily Sleptsov, Pyotr Tkachev, Gleb Uspensky, Yakov Polonsky and Evgenia Konradi.

References

1866 establishments in the Russian Empire
1868 disestablishments in the Russian Empire
Defunct magazines published in Russia
Feminist magazines
Magazines established in 1866
Magazines disestablished in 1868
Monthly magazines published in Russia
Magazines published in Saint Petersburg
Russian-language magazines
Women's magazines published in Russia

ru:Женский Вестник (журнал, 1866—1868)